A Mother's Secret may refer to:
 A Mother's Secret (1918 film), an American silent drama film
 A Mother's Secret (1952 film), a French drama film